Paying the Price: Killing the Children of Iraq is a 2000 Carlton Television documentary written and presented by John Pilger which was directed by Alan Lowery. In this documentary Pilger argues that UN sanctions had a devastating effect on the children of Iraq during the 1990s.

Synopsis
John Pilger and Alan Lowery traveled to Iraq with Denis Halliday, a former assistant secretary-general of the United Nations who resigned over what he called the "immoral policy" of economic sanctions. There they expected to find a suffering nation held hostage to the compliance of a dictator, Saddam Hussein. What they found was a country being slowly strangled by a draconian U.S./U.K. blockade.

Interviewees
 Dennis Halliday – Former Asst. Secretary General, United Nations
 Robert Gates – CIA Director 1991-93
 Hans von Sponeck – Chief UN co-ordinator, Iraq
 Ambassador Peter van Walsum – Chairman, UN Sanctions Committee
 Professor Karol Sikora – Former Chief of Cancer Programme, World Health Organization
 James Rubin – US State Department spokesman
 Scott Ritter – UN Weapons Inspector 1991-1998
 Said Aburish – Author, Saddam Hussein:  The Politics of Revenge
 Mohammed Amin Ezzet – Conductor, Iraqi National Orchestra
 Anupama Rao Singh – UNICEF Representative, Iraq
 Professor Doug Rokke – Former US Army health physicist
 Dr. Jinan Ghalib Hassen – Paediatrician
 Dr. Jawad Al-Ali – Cancer specialist
 Laith Kubba – Iraqi opposition exile
 Felicity Arbuthnot – Journalist
 Hussain Jarsis – Shepherd

Awards and festival screenings
 Chris Award, Columbus International Film & Video Festival
 Vancouver International Film Festival

References

External links
 

2000 television specials
British television documentaries
Documentary films about Iraq
Documentary films presented by John Pilger
2000 films
2000s English-language films
2000s British films